Clitistes is a monotypic genus of araneomorph spiders in the family Dictynidae, containing the single species, Clitistes velutinus. It was first described by Eugène Simon in 1902, and is only found in Chile.

References

External links

Dictynidae
Monotypic Araneomorphae genera
Endemic fauna of Chile